Dheva Anrimusthi (born 5 December 1998) is an Indonesian para badminton player. He won the silver medal in the men singles SU5 event of the 2020 Summer Paralympics.

Career 
Anrimusthi had a motorcycle accident as a teenager. His right hand could not straighten or was permanently bent. The condition made him withdraw from the badminton club. When he wanted to train again, several badminton clubs rejected him.

The National Paralympic Committee (NPC) invited Anrimusthi to join in 2016. His parents had objected because they did not want their son to be considered disabled. After getting permission, Dheva proved his ability in the championship by winning three gold medals in the men's singles in the right-handed category, men's doubles, and team.

Awards and nominations

Achievements

Paralympic Games
Men's singles

World Championships
Men's singles

Men's doubles

Asian Para Games 
Men's singles

Men's doubles

ASEAN Para Games 
Men's singles

Men's doubles

Asian Youth Para Games 
Men's singles

Men's doubles

BWF Para Badminton World Circuit (3 titles) 

The BWF Para Badminton World Circuit – Grade 2, Level 1, 2 and 3 tournaments has been sanctioned by the  Badminton World Federation from 2022.

Men's singles 

Men's doubles

International Tournaments (10 titles, 3 runners-up) 
Men's singles

Men's doubles

References

1998 births
Living people
People from Kuningan
Indonesian male badminton players
Indonesian para-badminton players
Paralympic badminton players of Indonesia
Badminton players at the 2020 Summer Paralympics
Medalists at the 2020 Summer Paralympics
Paralympic silver medalists for Indonesia
Paralympic medalists in badminton